Henry Sloughter (died July 23, 1691) was briefly colonial governor of New York in 1691.  Sloughter was the governor who put down Leisler's Rebellion, which had installed Jacob Leisler as de facto governor in 1689.  He died suddenly in July 1691.  Lieutenant Governor Richard Ingoldesby, who had served against Leisler's rebels, took over after Sloughter's death until the arrival of Benjamin Fletcher.

References
 British Governors of Colonial New York

Year of birth missing
1691 deaths
Governors of the Province of New York